The Jordan-Beggs House (also known as the Beggs/Davis House) is a historic site in Madison, Florida, United States. It is located at 211 North Washington Street. On June 13, 1997, it was added to the U.S. National Register of Historic Places.

References

Gallery

Houses on the National Register of Historic Places in Florida
Houses in Madison County, Florida
National Register of Historic Places in Madison County, Florida
Colonial Revival architecture in Florida
Houses completed in 1895
1895 establishments in Florida